Barbarika (Barbarīka) or Khatu Shyam, is a Hindu deity, mostly worshipped in Northern India. According to the Skanda Purana, Barbarika was the son of Ghatotkacha (Son of Bhima) and Princess Maurvi, daughter of Daitya Moora, though other references state that he was a warrior from the south. He is not a character who appears in the original Mahabharata, likely retroactively added to certain traditions through syncretism. Barbarika was originally a yaksha, reborn as a man. He was bound by his principle of always fighting on the weaker side, which led him to stand witness to the Kurukshetra war without taking part in it.

In Nepal, Kirati king Yalambar, is believed to be the Barbarik of Mahabharata, son of Ghatotkach and grandson of Bheem. Barbarik had the dubious honor of being slain in the battle of the Mahabharata, in which gods and mortals fought alongside each other. Legend credits him with meeting Indra, the lord of heaven, who ventured into the Valley in human guise, while natives of the Kathmandu Valley portray him as Akash Bhairav.

In Rajasthan, Barbarika is worshipped as Khatu Shyam in Khatu Shyam Temple, and in Gujarat, he is worshipped as Baliyadev and is believed to have been sacrificed before the Mahabharata war to ensure the victory of his grandfathers, the Pandavas. Because of his great devotion and sacrifice.He was given the title "Khatu shyamji" by shri krishna

Other names
Barbarika: Khatushyam's childhood name was Barbarika. His mother and relatives used to call him by this name before the name Shyam given by Krishna.
Sheesh Ke Daani: Literally: "Donor of Head"; As per the legend related above.
Haare Ka Sahara: Literally: "Support of the defeated"; Upon his mother's advice, Barbarika resolved to support whoever has less power and is losing. Hence he is known by this name. This has also led to a popular verse often sung by people who are passing through difficult times: Haare Ka Sahara, Khatushyam Hamara [We are in doldrums, but let's not worry; Khatushyam is with us!]
Teen Baan Dhaari: Literally: "Bearer of three arrows"; Reference is to the three infallible arrows that he received as a boon from Goddess Kamakshya . These arrows were sufficient to destroy the whole world. The title written below these three arrows is Maam Sevyam Parajitah.
Lakha-datari: Literally: "The Munificent Giver"; One who never hesitates to give his devotees whatever they need and ask for.
Leela ke Aswaar: Literally: "Rider of Leela"; Being the name of his blue-coloured horse. Many call it Neela Ghoda or "blue horse."
Khatu Naresh: Literally: "The King of Khatu"; One who rules Khatu and the whole universe.
Kalyug Ke Avtaar: Literally: "The God of Kali Yuga"; As per Krishna he will be the God who will save good people in the era of Kali Yuga.
Shyam Pyarey: Literally: "Beloved Shyam"
Baliya Dev: Literally: " The god who sacrificed himself"; newly born children are blessed in the temple located in Vasna, Ahmedabad, Gujarat.
 Morechadidharak: Literally: "The bearer of the stick made of peacock feathers"
 Shyam Baba: The name prevalent between marwadi community.
 Barish Ka Devta: Literally: "The God of rain"; One who controls rain according to his will. Prevalent name in Kamrunag Temple at Mandi, Himachal Pradesh.
 Yalambar: Yalambar was a Kirat warrior and First King of Kirata Kingdom in Nepal.
 Akash Bhairava: Literally: "The God of sky"; One of the many dangerous Bhairava form of Lord Shiva.
 Sava Bhakku Deva: Literally: "The Guardian of the sky"; Prevalent name between Licchavi community in Kathmandu
 Wanga Dya: Literally: "The God of sky protection"; the first ancestral King of Kirat People in Nepal.
 Hatu Dyah: Literally: "The pure alcohol God "; One who gives alcohol as a blessing, Prevalent name in Newari Language
 Āju Dyah: Literally: "The ancestral God"; Commonly known as progenitor of the Maharjan community of Nepal

Barbarika and his dialogue with Krishna
Barbarika/ Belarsen was a grandson of Bhima (second of the Pandava brothers), and the son of Ghatotkacha. Ghatotkacha was the son of Bhima and Hidimbi. Even in his childhood, Barbarika was a very brave warrior. He learnt the art of warfare from his mother. The gods (ashtadeva) gave him the three infallible arrows. Hence, Barbarika came to be known as "Bearer of Three Arrows".
When Barbarika learnt that the battle between the Pandavas and the Kauravas had become inevitable, he wanted to witness what was to be the Mahābhārata War. He promised his mother that if he felt the urge to participate in the battle, he would join the side that would be losing. He rode to the field on his blue horse, equipped with his three arrows and bow.

According to folklore, before the Kurukshetra War began,  Krishna asked all the warriors how many days it would take to finish the Mahabharata war alone. Bhishma answered that he would take 20 days to finish the war. Dronacharya replied that it would take him 25 days. When Karna was asked, he said he would take 24 days. Arjuna told Krishna it would take 28 days for him to complete the battle by himself. In this manner,  Krishna asked each warrior and received an answer.

Krishna, disguised as a Brahmin, stopped Barbarika to examine his strength. When asked how many days he would take to finish the war alone, Barbarika answered that he could finish it in one minute. Krishna then asked Barbarika how he would finish the great battle with just three arrows. Barbarika replied that a single arrow was enough to destroy all his opponents in the war, and it would then return to his quiver. He stated that the first arrow is used to mark all the things that he wants to destroy. If he uses the second arrow, then the second arrow will mark all the things that he wants to save. On using the third arrow, it will destroy all the things that are marked and then return to his quiver. In other words, with one arrow he can fix all his targets and with the other, he can destroy them. Another version of the story goes thus, "Barbarika had come to Kurukshetra armed with just three arrows. ‘With one, I can destroy the Pandavas. With the other, the Kauravas. And with the third, Krishna,’ he said boastfully."

Krishna then challenged him to tie all the leaves of the peepal tree under which he was standing, using his arrows. Barbarika accepted the challenge and started meditating to release his arrow by closing his eyes. As Barbarika started meditating, Krishna quietly plucked a leaf from the tree and hid it under his foot. When Barbarika released his first arrow, it marked all the leaves of the tree and finally started hovering around the leg of Krishna. Krishna asked Barbarika why the arrow was hovering over his foot. Barbarika replied that there must be a leaf under his foot and the arrow was targeting his foot to mark the leaf that was hidden underneath. Barbarika advised Krishna to lift his leg, since otherwise the arrow would mark the leaf by piercing Krishna's foot. Krishna then lifted his foot and the first arrow also marked the hidden leaf. The third arrow then collected all the leaves (including the hidden leaf ) and tied them together. By this, Krishna concluded that the arrows were so powerful and infallible, that even if Barbarika was unaware of the whereabouts of his targets, his arrows could still navigate and trace his intended targets. Thus, Krishna gets a deeper insight into Barbarika's phenomenal power.

Krishna then asked the boy whom he would favour in the war. Barbarika revealed that he intends to fight for the side whichever is weak. As the Pandavas had only seven Akshauhini armies compared to the eleven of the Kauravas, he considered that the Pandavas to be relatively the weaker side and hence wished to support them. But Krishna then asked him if he had seriously given a thought about the consequences, before giving such a word to his mother (about supporting the weaker side). Barbarika assumed that his support to the relatively weaker Pandava side would make them victorious. Krishna then revealed the actual consequences of his word to his mother:

Krishna says that whichever side he supports will end up making the other side weaker due to his power. Nobody would be able to defeat him. Hence, as he will be forced to switch sides to support the other side that has become weaker (due to his word to his mother). Thus, in an actual war, he would keep oscillating between the two sides, thereby destroying the entire army of both sides and eventually only he would remain. Subsequently, none of the sides would become victorious and he would be the lone survivor. Hence, Krishna avoids his participation in the war by seeking his head in charity.

Act of charity

Krishna then explained to him that before a battle, the head of the bravest Kshatriya needs to be sacrificed, in order to worship/sanctify the battlefield. Krishna said that he considered Barbarika to be the bravest among Kshatriyas, and was hence asking for his head in charity. In fulfillment of his promise, and in compliance with Krishna's command, Barbarika gave his head to him in charity. This happened on the 12th day of the Shukla Paksha (bright half) of the month of Phalgun on Tuesday. Barbarika was a Yaksha in his previous birth. Once  Brahma and several other Devas came to Vaikuntha and complained to  Vishnu that the Adharma on Earth was increasing; it was not possible for them to bear the tortures causes by the wicked people. Hence they came to seek the help of  Vishnu to check them.  Vishnu told the Devas that he will soon be incarnated on Earth as a human being and destroy all the evil forces. Then, a Yaksha told the Devas that he alone is enough to kill all evil elements on the Earth, and it was not necessary for  Vishnu to descend to Earth. This hurt  Brahma very much.  Brahma cursed this Yaksha that whenever the time comes to eliminate all the evil forces on Earth, then  Vishnu will first kill him. Later, the Yaksha takes birth as Barbarika and  Krishna seeks his head in charity as a result of this curse. Since that day Human Barbarika become the Khatu Shyam, The realizer of  Krishna by Barbarika given his head and God Krishna himself manifested in his heart.

Bearing witness to the war
Before decapitating himself, Barbarika told Krishna of his great desire to view the forthcoming battle and requested him to facilitate the same. Krishna agreed and placed the head on top of a hill overlooking the battlefield. From the hill, the head of Barbarika watched the entire battle.

At the end of the battle, the victorious Pandava brothers argued among themselves as to who was responsible for their victory. Krishna suggested that Barbarika's head, which had watched the whole battle should be allowed to judge. Barbarika's head suggested that it was Krishna alone who was responsible for the victory.
Barbarika replies, “All I could see was one thing, a divine chakra spinning all around the battlefield, killing all those who were not on the side of Dharma. Listening to this, Pandavas realized that it was  Narayana who actually eradicated the Adharma from the world, and the Pandavas were mere instruments. After the war, Barbarika's head was joined with his body and he left that place for narrating the whole world to maintain peace.

His other name is God Kamrunaag and is venerated as the preeminent deity in District Mandi, in Himachal Pradesh. A pond and a temple are situated in Kamru hill in Sundernagar, District Mandi. He witnessed the entire battle of Kurukshetra from the hill which is now known as Khatushyam Temple, located in Khatu village in Sikar District, Rajasthan. An impressive and especially sacred Temple of Baliyadev, Barbarik is situated at village Lambha in Ahmedabad District, Gujarat.

Observances and festivals

Barbarika is worshiped as Shyam, he is not the supreme personality of godhead Sri Krishna or any of Krishna's incarnation but may be considered as the great devotee of Krishna. And since the glories of Krishna's devotee is more than Krishna himself people worship Khatushyam also. Therefore, the flavour of the festivities reflects the playful and vibrant nature of Krishna. The festivals of Krishna Janmaashtami, Jhool Jhulani Ekadashi, Holi and Vasant Panchami are celebrated with gusto in the temple. The Phalguna Mela detailed below is the principal annual festival.

Lacs of devotees visits the temple every day. Newly married couples come to pay homage and newborn babies are brought to the temple for their mundan (the first hair-shaving) ceremony. An elaborate aarti is performed at the temple five times a day. These are:
 Mangala Aarti: performed in the early morning, when the temple is open.
 Shringaar Aarti: performed at the time of make-up of Baba Shyam. The idol is grandly ornamented for this aarti.
 Sandhya Aarti: performed in the evening, at sunset.
 Shayan Aarti: performed in the night, at around 10 PM.

Two special hymns, the "Shri Shyam Aarti" and the "Shri Shyam Vinati," are chanted on all these occasions. The Shyam mantra is another litany of the 's names that is chanted by devotees.

Other particular observances include:

Shukla Ekadashi and Dwadashi: The 11th and 12th days of the bright half of every month in the Hindu calendar is of special significance to the temple. This is because Barbarika was born on the 11th day of the bright half of the month of Kartika, and he donated his head (Sheesh) to Krishna on the 12th day of the bright half of the month of Phalgun on Tuesday. Darshan on these two days is therefore considered auspicious and devotees come in their thousands every month. The temple remains open throughout the night that falls between these days. Devotees organize Bhajan programmes and invite Bhajan singers to sing devotional songs.

Bathing in the Shyam Kund: This is the holy pond near the temple from which the idol was retrieved. It is believed that a dip in this pond cures a person of ailments and brings good health. Filled with devotional fervour, people take ritual dips in the Shyam Kund. They believe that this will relieve them of diseases and contagion. Bathing during the annual Phalguna Mela festival is deemed specially salutary.

Nishan Yatra: It is believed that your wishes are granted if you offer a Nishan at the temple. A Nishan is a triangular flag of a particular size, made of cloth, which is hoisted on a bamboo stick. It is carried in one's hands while covering the route from the town of Ringas to Khatu (17  km) on (bare) foot. Nishans are offered in millions during the Phalguna Mela.

Phalguna Mela: The most important festival associated with the temple is the Phalguna Mela which occurs just 8–9 days before the festival of Holi. Barbarika's head appeared on Phalguna Shuddha Ekadashi, the 11th day of the bright half of the Hindu month of Phalguna. Therefore, the fair is held from the 9th to the 12th of that month. The fair has now been extended to nearly 12–15 days of the bright half of the Phalguna month.

On this holy occasion, pilgrims all over the country come here on foot with nishaans (holy mark - flags) in their hands. People enjoy their holy journey by singing shyam bhajans and playing various musical instruments. They enjoy the journey by playing Holi with gulal. Many Shyam Bhaktas supply food to pedestrians in the shade of tents. They encourage also them to complete their journey with full enthusiasm. They enjoy this occasion as the marriage of Khatushyamji. People enjoy the mela by purchasing various things. On Dwadashi (= 12th day of a month), Bhog is being prepared as Baba's –Prasadi of Kheer Churama.

Special arrangements for security are made to control the crowd. Around 500,000 people visit in three days of this holy mela in this small village.

It is believed that the offerings made to Shyambaba is one of the highest collection made in India. There is also a new temple opened in Bengaluru, India.

See also
Iravan

References

Puranas
Shaiva texts
Folklore characters
Characters in Hindu mythology
Hindu gods